Lamb of God is the tenth studio album by American heavy metal band Lamb of God. The album was through Epic and Nuclear Blast on June 19, 2020 due to the COVID-19 pandemic. Lamb of God marks the first studio album of all-new material by the band since 2015's VII: Sturm und Drang, making it the longest gap between their albums, and the first to feature Art Cruz as the replacement for original drummer Chris Adler, who left the band in July 2019. Lamb of God was once again produced by longtime collaborator Josh Wilbur, who has worked with the band since 2006's Sacrament.

A three-disc deluxe edition with two bonus tracks, along with an additional CD and DVD featuring the band's live stream event from September 18, 2020, in which the band performed Lamb of God in its entirety plus four encore tracks, was released on March 26, 2021 through Nuclear Blast.

Critical reception

Lamb of God received critical acclaim from music critics upon its release. At review aggregate Metacritic, the album has an average score of 81 out of 100 based on eight reviews, indicating "universal acclaim reviews". At AnyDecentMusic?, the album has an average score of 7.5 out of 10 based on six reviews.

James Christopher Monger from AllMusic awarded the album four out of five stars, describing the album "a tense, yet confident album for taut and uncomfortable times." Manus Hopkins from Exclaim! scored the album 7 out of 10, and said that while nothing in Lamb of God feels "groundbreaking" or "cutting-edge" like the band's previous albums, the album is still "essentially what fans should expect from the band at this point." James McMahon from NME also gave the album four out of five stars, calling the album "a record that's the most authentic version of the band Lamb of God want to be." He particularly singled out the song "Memento Mori", which "driven by Mark Morton's unforgiving guitar, flirts with the ethereal goth of the Sisters of Mercy."

Kory Grow from Rolling Stone gave the album three out of five stars, stating that the album contains "the sort of piledriving guitar riffs and Olympic-medal-worthy drumming the band has perfected over the last 20 years" which making it easy for the band's "less political fans" to "get in on the fun." He also praised Blythe's "open-minded" and "inclusive" lyrics that make listeners to "strain your ears to make sense of his screeds."

Accolades

Commercial performance
Lamb of God debuted at No. 15 on the Billboard 200, selling 30,000 album-equivalent units in its first week of release, of which 27,000 were pure album sales. The album also debuted at No. 2 on both the Current Album Sales and Top Rock Albums charts, and No. 1 on the Hard Rock Albums charts.

Track listing

Personnel
Credits are adapted from the album's liner notes.

Lamb of God
 Randy Blythe – vocals
 Mark Morton – lead guitar
 Willie Adler – rhythm guitar
 John Campbell – bass
 Art Cruz – drums

Additional musicians
 Jamey Jasta – guest vocals 
 Chuck Billy – guest vocals 
 Samantha Wilbur – children voice 
 Maxwell Wilbur – children voice

Production and design
 Josh Wilbur – production, engineering, mixing
 Kevin Billingslea – engineering
 Nick Rowe – engineering
 Oliver Roman – engineering 
 Jerred Pollaci – engineering 
 Evan Myaskovsky – engineering 
 Kyle Hynes – engineering 
 Matthew Erlichman – engineering 
 Paul Bruski – engineering 
 Ted Jensen  – mastering
 K3n Adams – artwork, art direction
 Randy Blythe – photography
 Travis Shinn – photography

Charts

Weekly charts

Year-end charts

References

2020 albums
Albums postponed due to the COVID-19 pandemic
Epic Records albums
Lamb of God (band) albums
Nuclear Blast albums